{{Infobox election
| election_name     = 2015 Wirral Metropolitan Borough Council election
| country           = England
| flag_year         = 
| flag_image        = Coat of arms of Wirral Metropolitan Borough Council.png 
| type              = parliamentary
| ongoing           = no
| party_colour      =
| party_name        =
| previous_election = 2014 Wirral Metropolitan Borough Council election
| previous_year     = 2014
| election_date     = 
| next_election     = 2016 Wirral Metropolitan Borough Council election
| next_year         = 2016
| seats_for_election= 22 of 66 seats (One Third)to Wirral Metropolitan Borough Council
| majority_seats    = 34
| opinion_polls     =
| turnout           =69.1% (33.5%)

| map_image         = Wirral Council Election Results Map 2015.svg
| map_size          = 
| map_alt           = 
| map               = 
| map_caption       = Map of results of 2015 election

| title             = Leader of the Council
| before_election   = Phil Davies
| before_party      = Labour Party (UK)
| posttitle         = Leader of the Council after election
| after_election    = Phil Davies
| after_party       = Labour Party (UK)
| previous_mps      =
| elected_mps       =
| next_mps          =
|image1             = 
|leader1            = 
|party1             = Labour Party (UK)
|last_election1     = 
|leaders_seat1      = 
|seats_before1      = 38
|seats_needed1      = 
| seats1            = 14
| seats_after1      = 39
| seat_change1      = ''1| popular_vote1     = 79,409| percentage1       = 47.9%| swing1            = 9.3%|image2             = 
|leader2            = 
|party2             = Conservative Party (UK)
|last_election2     = 
|leaders_seat2      = 
|seats_before2      = 21
|seats_needed2      =
| seats2            = 7
| seats_after2      = 21
| seat_change2      = 
| popular_vote2     = 46,611	
| percentage2       = 28.1%
| swing2            = 0.1%

|image4             = 
|leader4            = 
|party4             = Liberal Democrats (UK)
|leaders_seat4      = 
|last_election4     = 
|seats_before4      = 6
|seats_needed4      = 
| seats4            = 1 
| seats_after4      = 5
| seat_change4      = 1
| popular_vote4     = 13,572
| percentage4       = 8.2%
| swing4       =0.4%

|image5             = 
|leader5            = 
|party5             = Green Party of England and Wales
|last_election5     = 
|leaders_seat5      = 
|seats_before5      = 1
|seats_needed5      = 
| seats5            = 0
| seats_after5      = 1
| seat_change5      = 
| popular_vote5     = 10,446
| percentage5       = 6.3%
| swing5       =1.7%

}}

The 2015 Wirral Metropolitan Borough Council election took place on 7 May 2015 to elect members of Wirral Metropolitan Borough Council in England. This election was held on the same day as other local elections.

After the election, the composition of the council was:

Election results

Overall election result

Overall result compared with 2014.

 

Changes in council compositionPrior to the election the composition of the council was:After the election the composition of the council was:

Ward results
Bebington

Bidston and St James

Birkenhead and Tranmere

Bromborough

Clatterbridge

Claughton

Eastham

Greasby, Frankby and Irby

Heswall

Hoylake and Meols

Leasowe and Moreton East

Liscard

Moreton West and Saughall Massie

New Brighton

Oxton

Pensby and Thingwall

 

Prenton

Rock Ferry

 

Seacombe

 

Upton

Wallasey

West Kirby and Thurstaston

Changes between 2015 and 2016

Notes

• italics denote the sitting councillor • bold''' denotes the winning candidate

References

2015 English local elections
May 2015 events in the United Kingdom
2015
2010s in Merseyside